Laura Andel (born 1968) is an Argentinian musician, conductor and composer.

Biography
Laura Andel was born in Argentina and has Moldovan descent, and began music lessons in Buenos Aires at the age of five. She played woodwind as a child and began to compose at an early age.  She graduated from Escuela de Música Popular de Avellaneda in Buenos Aires with a degree in Tango performance, and in January 1993, she began the study of jazz composition and music for film at Berklee College of Music in Boston.

After completing her studies, Andel moved to New York City in 2000 where she has worked as a composer and conductor. She is the leader of the Laura Andel Orchestra and has conducted her music in cities including New York, Boston, Buenos Aires, Caracas, and Berlin.

Awards and honors
BMI Foundation-Jerry Harrington Jazz Composers Award
Rockefeller Foundation fellow at the Bellagio Study Center in Italy
Margaret Fairbank Jory Copying Assistance Program Grant from the American Music Center
Music Composition Grant from the Massachusetts Cultural Council
Artist-in-residence at the MacDowell Colony (Peterborough, NH, 2002)
Artist-in-residence at Sacatar Foundation (Bahia, Brazil, 2003/2004)

Works
Andel has focused on composing for large ensembles. Her compositions use elements from Jazz and classical music, and feature unusual combinations of instruments. Selected works include:
SomnambulisT''' In::Tension:.. Doble ManoApsidesIn the midstNoise MachineDiscography
Music recorded and released on CD includes: Berklee Discover (1997)SomnambulisT Orchestra SomnambulisT Red Toucan (2002) Laura Andel Orchestra/Doble Mano Jazz Composers Alliance Orchestra In, Thru, and Out (2003)  Amalgam(e) 10 years of Red Toucan (2004)Jazz Composers Alliance Orchestra Celebration of the Spirit (2004)Laura Andel Electric Percussive Orchestra/I n : : t e n s i o n :  Rossbin Records (2005)

Independent releases:
Laura Andel Music for [+°-] 20 Musicians Music by Laura Andel (2000)
Laura Andel Jazz Orchestra Music by Laura Andel (1997)
Laura Andel & Oli Bott Jazz Orchestra Live in Berlin 1999 Music by Laura Andel and Oli Bott (1999)
Laura Andel & Oli Bott Jazz Orchestra Music by Laura Andel and Oli Bott (1998)

References

1968 births
20th-century classical composers
21st-century classical composers
Argentine classical composers
Women classical composers
Jazz-influenced classical composers
Living people
Argentine people of Moldovan descent
City University of New York faculty
Hostos Community College faculty
20th-century women composers
21st-century women composers
Argentine women composers